The Ombudsman Institution is a Turkish institution that examines and investigates complaints and submits recommendations about the conformity of the activities of the Government of Turkey with law and fairness under the respect for human rights. The institution is independent of the government and answers to the Parliament alone. The Ombudsman Institution evaluates complaints of both individuals and legal entities. Foreign nationals may also lodge complaints to the Ombudsman Institution.

Its functioning is regulated by article 74 of the Constitution and by bill number 6328 of the Parliament from June 14, 2012. The office is accredited as Turkey's national human rights institution.

History 
The Ombudsman Institution is created following the 2010 Turkish constitutional referendum, in which articles about appealing to an Ombudsman were adopted.

In 2014, the Ombudsman Institution created together with UNICEF the website “” for children. The aim of the website is to provide a platform for children to apply to the Ombudsman Institution for violations of children's rights.

International 
The Turkish Ombudsman Institution is a voting member of the International Ombudsman Institute (IOI).

List of Chief Ombudspersons

References

External links

Turkey
Human rights in Turkey
Politics of Turkey
Human rights organizations based in Turkey
2012 establishments in Turkey